Harry Frank Moore,  (29 March 1924 – 14 August 2009) was an Australian Labor Party politician, elected as a member of the New South Wales Legislative Assembly for the Tuggerah from 1981 to 1988 and for Wyong from 1988 to 1991.

Moore was a veteran of World War II, in which he served in the Australian Army in the Pacific. In 1989, he was responsible for new laws in the New South Wales Parliament which legalised the traditional soldier's game of Two-up on Anzac Day each year.

Moore was awarded a Medal of the Order of Australia in 1993 in recognition of his community service, and the Centenary Medal for his service to politics in 2001. He died in August 2009 from pneumonia.

References

 

1924 births
2009 deaths
20th-century Australian politicians
Australian Labor Party members of the Parliament of New South Wales
Australian Army personnel of World War II
Members of the New South Wales Legislative Assembly
Recipients of the Centenary Medal
Recipients of the Medal of the Order of Australia
Deaths from pneumonia in Australia